This article lists the diplomatic missions of Abkhazia. The Republic of Abkhazia is a state with limited recognition, which declared independence from Georgia in 1994, but did not receive recognition from any UN member states after the 2008 South Ossetia war. Abkhazia is recognized by Russia, Nicaragua, Venezuela, Nauru and Syria.  In addition, it is recognized also by Artsakh, South Ossetia, and Transnistria, which are all not members of the United Nations. Until early 2022, Abkhazia has four embassies abroad and small network of representative offices in near countries. Abkhazia also has four honorary consulates. The Donetsk People's Republic and Luhansk People's Republic had diplomatic relations with Abkhazia prior to being annexed by Russia in 2022.

Americas

 Managua (Embassy)

 Caracas (Embassy)

Asia

 Jerusalem (Representative office)

Damascus (Embassy)

 Istanbul (Representative office)

Europe

 Moscow (Embassy)

 Tskhinvali (Embassy)
 
Tiraspol (Representative office)

Oceania

 Aiwo (Embassy)

Non-resident embassies
 (Moscow)
 (Moscow)
 (Moscow)
 (Moscow)
 Yemen (Houthi-backed government) (Damascus)

See also
Foreign relations of Abkhazia
List of diplomatic missions in Abkhazia

Notes

References

External links
Ministry of Foreign Affairs of Abkhazia

Foreign relations of Abkhazia
Abkhazia
Abkhazia-related lists